General elections were held in Bosnia and Herzegovina on 3 October 2010. They decided the makeup of Bosnia and Herzegovina's Presidency as well as national, entity, and cantonal governments.

The elections for the House of Representatives were divided into two; one for the Federation of Bosnia and Herzegovina and one for Republika Srpska. In the presidential election, voters in the Federation elected Bosniak Bakir Izetbegović and re-elected Croat Željko Komšić, while voters in Republika Srpska re-elected Serb Nebojša Radmanović. The Social Democratic Party and the Alliance of Independent Social Democrats emerged as the largest parties in the House of Representatives, each winning 8 of the 42 seats.

Background
After the Bosnian War and the Dayton Agreement that ended the war, the constitution set out, in Article V, a tripartite rotational Presidency between the Bosniak, Croat and Serb entities. Each Presidency member serves a four-year term, with the Chairman of the Presidency rotation every 8 months, with the first chairman being the one with most votes in the election.

Candidates

Presidency
There were three candidates for the Bosniak member of the Presidency: the incumbent Haris Silajdžić, of Party for Bosnia and Herzegovina, the owner of Dnevni avaz Fahrudin Radončić, of the Union for a Better Future of BiH and Bakir Izetbegović of the Party of Democratic Action and the son of Alija Izetbegović, the founding president of Bosnia and Herzegovina.

The Croat candidate was: incumbent Željko Komšić from the Social Democratic Party, who was elected in 2006 when large numbers of Bosniaks voted for him rather than voting for a Bosniak candidate.

The Serb candidate was: incumbent Nebojša Radmanović of the Alliance of Independent Social Democrats, who was expected to win.

Campaign
Following the International Court of Justice's opinion that Kosovo's declaration of independence did not violate international law Republika Srpska's Prime Minister Milorad Dodik said there would be repercussions in Bosnia and Herzegovina and that the issue would be discussed in depth after the elections. During his campaign Dodik reiterated support for the secession of Republika Srpska from Bosnia and Herzegovina and denied that the massacre in Srebrenica constituted a genocide. Boris Tadić, president of Serbia, expressed his support for Dodik, Tadić stated that he was "here to support my friends who run RS in the best possible way". He was later criticised by the SDA for supporting "a man who openly denies genocide in Srebrenica and calls for secession of Republika Srpska."

The Croat and Bosniak candidates were "strong supporters of a unified Bosnia," while Serb candidate advocated the separation of the Bosnian Serbs entity from the rest of the country. Dodik asserted that "Only the Serb Republic is self-sustaining, Bosnia-Herzegovina is not." He had a "strategic partnership" with the Croat nationalist Dragan Čović to support each other's calls for greater independence or autonomy as the Croatian side advocated. The Bosniaks, however, said would fight for a united Bosnia, and sought a stronger federal government - a key condition for European Union membership.

These polls were described as the most crucial since the civil war as a lot of campaigning focused on ethnic nationalism and voting for candidates of the same ethnicity. One political analyst, compared this campaign to that of 1990, before the partition of Yugoslavia, when Bosnia had the choice of becoming a part of greater Serbia or an independent multi-ethnic country pointed out that "for exactly 20 years we have been spinning around in the same political pattern."

The official campaign started on 3 September, and lasted for next 30 days. Hate speech in the election campaign in BiH has become a normal occurrence. Because of that, Central Election Commission announced that they will not tolerate any form of hate speech. Nervousness of political parties was manifested through the violation of the Election Law of BiH, and particularly through the manipulation of so-called public opinion research and publication in the form of paid advertising. The first phase of the media war waged mainly through portals and news releases.

The campaign was significant because politicians were allowed to "use all their weapons" in publicity. Experts stated that this campaign was something new in Bosnia and Herzegovina because it was creative as opposed to the earlier campaigns.

Our Party (NS) - Election campaign of the coalition of the Our Party nad New Socialist Party - Zdravko Kršmanović started on 3 September by laying a wreath at the memorial area of Donja Gradina, at the Jasenovac concentration camp.
Serb Democratic Party (SDS) - They started their election campaign with advertisements and election rallies in Banja Luka.
Alliance of Independent Social Democrats (SNSD) - SNSD started election campaign at noon of 3 September on Squer of Krajina in Banja Luka with simbolic sticking of their first propaganda poster. President of the SNSD and candidat for president of Republika Srpska Milorad Dodik and president of Executive Board of SNSD and candidate for member of Presidency of Bosnia and Herzegovina Nebojša Radmanović had stick that first propaganda poster.
Croatian Democratic Union of Bosnia and Herzegovina (HDZ BiH) - President of the party, prof. dr. sc. Dragan Čović hung out with the most socially vulnerable members of population. He stated that his party wants to emphasize the social care for people of Bosnia and Herzegovina, especially between Croats. Candidate for memeer of Presidency of Bosnia and Herzegovina Borjana Krišto started her official campaign on 3 September from her birth town Livno. In the morning she laid a wreath at the Memorial Center in the Donji Rujani, and at noon she addressed to the citizens at King Tomislav's Square in Livno, then she hung out with the assembled multitude. At the presence of many citizens, friends and members of her family she stated that her start of election campaign is very symbolic because Livno is a Croatian town that "never lost a single battle". She also added that she will come back victorious and "...announce victory of the Croatian people."
Union for a Better Future of BiH (SBB BiH) - At the first they of election campaign, supporters and sympathizers of the party had met at the Iftar in Gradačac. At this meeting they stated that they will win the elections because they will "probably win those who gaved fake hope to the people previous years". About 600 fasting persons welcomed the party's president and candidate for Bosniak member of the Presidency, Fahrudin Radončić. Large number of sympathizers waited Radončić at the entrance of "Europrof", where they later continued with Iftar.
Croatian Party of Rights - Candidate for Prime Minister of Herzegovina-Neretva Canton Živko Budmimir had opened his Election Campaign at midnight of 3 September. He talked to the police representatives and tour to the police patrols. Professor Petar Milić, president of the Main Department of Croatian Party of Rights of Bosnia and Herzegovina and candidate of Coalition of Croatian Democratic Union 1990 and Croatian Party of Rights for House of Representatives of Parliament of the Federation of Bosnia and Herzegovina started his campaign with the most sensitive part of Croats - the exiles.

Opinion polls
Opinion polls suggested Dodik's "Alliance of Independent Social Democrats" would remain the largest Serb party, as well as the country as a whole. The "Social Democratic Party" of Zlatko Lagumdžija would be the largest party in the federation, followed by the "Party of Democratic Action."

An analyst at the "Why not?" NGO in Sarajevo suggested the elections importance was because "change will finally happen [...] because the ones who are in power now have proved they are not capable of leading the country and bringing the necessary reforms. Civil society has been very active about these elections and we hope this will have an impact." She said that if there were changes in the establishment ethnic relations would not be as tense. An August 2010 survey of 2,000 respondents by the National Democratic Institute. suggested that voters on both sides are tired of nationalist rhetoric and pessimistic about the future of Bosnia. 87 percent felt that nationalist parties are leading the country in the wrong direction. Respondents said politicians discussed nationalist issues too much, while employment and economic issues were not discussed enough. They thought that the biggest issue was unemployment, followed by corruption and crime.

Results
In total, 3,126,599 citizens registered to vote. There were 5,276 polling centres: 4,981 regular, 145 for voting in absentia, 143 for voting in person and 7 at Bosnian embassies abroad. There were also 1,200 observers, including 485 international observers.

The Central Electoral Commission of Bosnia and Herzegovina ordered a recount of 66,138 votes that were declared void. This could change the victory of Nebojša Radmanović, candidate of the Alliance of Independent Social Democrats (SNSD), who won the Serb seat of the central presidency by a narrow margin of 9,697. Mladen Ivanić of the Party of Democratic Progress (PDP) lost by less than two percent.

Presidency

House of Representatives

By entity

House of Peoples
The 15 members of the House of Peoples was elected following the elections by the parliaments of the two entities – 10 members by the House of Representatives of the Parliament of the Federation of Bosnia and Herzegovina (5 Bosniaks and 5 Croats); and 5 members by the National Assembly of the Republika Srpska.

Federation of Bosnia and Herzegovina
In the Federation this includes:
Prime Minister of the FBiH
House of Representatives of the FBiH
House of Peoples of FBiH

House of Representatives of the Federation of Bosnia and Herzegovina

Canton Parliaments
All 289 seats in the assemblies of the cantons of the Federation of Bosnia and Herzegovina were up for election (Bosnian: skupština kantona, Croatian: sabor županije, Serbian Cyrillic: скупштина кантона).

Source - Central Electoral Commission of Bosnia and Herzegovina

Republika Srpska

Reactions
Štefan Füle, European commissioner for enlargement and neighbourhood policy, urged Bosnian politicians to speed up the establishment of State and Entity governments using the EU agenda as a negotiation base for coalition building. Füle underlined the need for constitutional amendments to ensure compliance with the European Convention on Human Rights and improve governance, for a new Census Law to provide reliable statistical data, and for the establishment of an independent state aid authority.

The US Secretary of State Hillary Clinton visited Bosnia and Herzegovina a week after the elections in an effort to push for political reforms to fully integration the entry into both the European Union and NATO. She also called for unity and criticised threats of secession of Srpska made by Milorad Dodik. A US diplomat in Europe said he thought the reforms are necessary and that "the Bosnians need to follow up. The rest of the region is moving towards Europe, and Bosnia is going to have to overcome these ethnic divisions [...] if they want to go down this path."

In the international media, the election was read as seeing the country "still mired in political deadlock and ethnic rivalry," because of a continued political stalemate that leaves the unique tripartite presidency split over the future of the country. This also meant a likelihood of a delayed economic recovery and the accession of Bosnia and Herzegovina to the European Union.

Analysis

Many officials of the Croatian Democratic Union party have claimed that the re-election of Željko Komšić (SDP) as the Croat member of the presidency was due to Bosniaks choosing to vote on the Croat list. Bulk of the votes Komšić received came from predominantly Bosniak areas and he fared quite poorly in Croat municipalities, supported by less than 2,5% of the electorate in a number of municipalities in Western Herzegovina, such as Široki Brijeg, Ljubuški (0,8%), Čitluk, Posušje and Tomislavgrad, while not being able to gain not even 10% in a number of others. Furthermore, total Croat population in whole of Federation of Bosnia and Herzegovina is estimated around 495,000; Komšić received 336,961 votes alone, while all other Croat candidates won 230,000 votes altogether. Croats of Bosnia and Herzegovina consider him to be an illegitimate representative and generally treat him as a second Bosniak member of the presidency. This raised frustration among Croats, undermined their trust in federal institutions and empowered claims for their own entity or a federal unit, while opening so-called "Croatian question".

The Social Democratic Party of Zlatko Lagumdžija appeared to be the biggest winner of the election, while the Party of Democratic Action contained their expected losses, while the Party for Bosnia and Herzegovina of Haris Silajdžić lost ground. The Alliance of the Independent Social Democrats of Milorad Dodik strengthened its presence in both Republika Srpska and at state level. None of the newly established parties, with the exception of Fahrudin Radončić's Union for a Better Future of BiH were able to pass the threshold and gain seats in either of the parliamentary bodies. Two blocs can therefore be noticed at state level: the Alliance of the Independent Social Democrats and the Croatian Democratic Union on one side and the Social Democratic Party and the Party of Democratic Action on the other. The negotiations to form a new government at both Federation and State level are expected to take some time.

In Republika Srpska, Dodik secured a stable majority, and his election as Entity President will likely signal a trend of presidentialisation of Srpska's political system, in line with what happened in Serbia after Boris Tadić's presidential election.

Aftermath

At the Federal level, the formation of government took place. There were two major coalitions which were formed after the election: Social Democratic Party, Party of Democratic Action, Croatian Party of Rights and People's Party Work for Betterment; and a looser grouping of the Alliance of Independent Social Democrats, Serb Democratic Party, Croatian Democratic Union and Croatian Democratic Union 1990. Neither group had a parliamentary majority, nor did they have full representation from the three constitutional peoples.

References

External links
Central Election Committee BiH

Elections in Bosnia and Herzegovina
Bosnia
2010 in Bosnia and Herzegovina
Bosnia